For the World War II use of the airport, see Dyersburg Army Air Base
Arnold Field  is a municipal public-use airport located two miles (3 km) northwest of the central business district of Halls, a town in Lauderdale County, Tennessee, United States. The airport is named for a former Mayor, Sammie Arnold

The airport is operated on the grounds of the former Dyersburg Army Air Base. In the 1940s the Dyersburg Army Air Base was a training facility for World War II B-17 Flying Fortress bomber pilots and crews.

In 2007, Arnold Field is home to 15 general purpose aircraft and the Veterans' Museum.

Facilities and aircraft
For the 12-month period ending December 3, 1996, the airport had 7,290 aircraft operations, an average of 19 per day: 99% general aviation and 1% military.

Veterans' Museum

Foundation and purpose
The Veterans' Museum, located on the site of the former air base, was built in 1997. It is owned and operated by the Dyersburg Army Air Base Memorial Association, a non-profit organization.

The purpose of the museum is the preservation and documentation of materials related to military activities from World War I to the Iraq War, as well as documenting the history of the air base itself.

RV parking is available at no charge, and admittance to the museum is free. Electrical hookup is $10 per day.

Exhibits
The exhibits of the Veterans' Museum stem from donations by organizations and individuals.

Outside exhibits of the museum are an A-7 Corsair II, a USMC CH-46E helicopter, and military vehicles.

The 8,900 ft2 (827 m2) indoor exhibition displays items ranging from military vehicle displays and uniforms to photographs, personal and official letters, diaries, technical publications, divisional histories, videos and other military memorabilia.

Murals painted by Ernie Berke and photographs of 72 crews are also displayed.

Special exhibits:

World War I – A complete uniform and field gear of local resident C.C Sumrow is from the collection of Tommy Simmons.
Memphis Belle Exhibit – The exhibit tells the story of the Memphis Belle, its crew, postwar history of the Belle, and a look at the Altus Crew who flew it to Memphis, Tennessee in 1946.
Home Front Exhibit – Pictures and uniforms of area veterans who served are on display. Also included in this exhibit are pictures of weddings where local ladies married soldiers in training at the Base.
At Home Exhibit – A living room looking like "at home" during the 1940s is shown. From the radio and the coal stove, to the buffet and other items, it provides a real look at rural homes.

Air shows
At irregular intervals, the museum organizes and houses air shows on Arnold Field.

Other facilities
The museum houses conference facilities for up to 50 people and the Sammie Arnold Lending Library, with books covering the topics documented in the museum.

References

External links

Airport page at Town of Halls website
Veterans' Museum site

1942 establishments in Tennessee
Airports in Tennessee
Buildings and structures in Lauderdale County, Tennessee
Transportation in Lauderdale County, Tennessee